Simon Wolfe Saunders (born 30 August 1954) is a British philosopher of physics. He is noted for his work on quantum mechanics (particularly the many-worlds interpretation-the Everett interpretation), on identity and indiscernibility in physics, and on structural realism.

Saunders is currently Professor of Philosophy of Physics at the University of Oxford, and Fellow of Merton College, having moved to Oxford in 1996. He has previously held untenured posts at Harvard University (1990-1996), and temporary or visiting positions at Wolfson College, Oxford (1985–89), the Hebrew University of Jerusalem (1989-1990), Harvard (2001), École Polytechnique (2004), University of British Columbia (2005), Perimeter Institute (2005), and IMéRA (L’Institut Méditerranéen de
Recherches Avancées) (2010). He is married to Kalypso Nicolaïdis; they have two children.

Education
Saunders was an early graduate of the Physics and Philosophy undergraduate degree at the University of Oxford. He then studied the part III Mathematics Tripos at Christ's College, Cambridge under Martin Rees, John Polkinghorne, and Peter Goddard, and completed his PhD at King's College, London in 1989 under the supervision of Michael Redhead. His thesis title was ‘Mathematical and Philosophical Foundations of Quantum Field Theory’.

Contributions to philosophy
Saunders was an early champion of 'structural realism', the view that mature physical theories correctly describe the structure of reality. Structural realism is today regarded by many philosophers as the most defensible form of realism.

He was also amongst the first to draw attention to the consequences of decoherence for the many-worlds interpretation (MWI) of quantum mechanics; he defended a decoherence-based version of MWI in a series of articles throughout the 1990s.

More recently, Saunders has worked extensively on the interpretation of probability in quantum mechanics. Along with David Deutsch and David Wallace, he has developed techniques for deriving the Born Rule, which relates quantum amplitudes to objective probabilities. He has applied these arguments to operational approaches to quantum mechanics as well as to MWI.

Saunders has also been a central figure in recent debates over identity and indiscernibility in physics. He was the first to apply the Hilbert-Bernays definition of identity in formal first-order languages to physical theories, both spacetime theories and quantum mechanics, going on to show that elementary fermions and composite bosons in quantum theory satisfied the principle of identity of indiscernibles, using the Hilbert-Bernays definition of identity.

In related work, he has argued that classical particles could be treated as indistinguishable in exactly the same way that quantum particles (and that departures from classical statistics can be traced to discrete nature of the measure -- dimensionality—of subspace of Hilbert space), and applied this to the Gibbs paradox.

Saunders has also developed a general framework for the treatment of symmetries whereby all symmetries, not only gauge symmetries, as applied to strictly closed systems, yield only redescriptions of the same physical state of affairs. In a slogan: 'only invariant properties and relations are physically real'.

In addition, Saunders has worked on quantum field theory, on the philosophy of time, and on the history of physics; he has written numerous encyclopaedia articles and book reviews.

Publications

Books
 Many Worlds?: Everett, quantum theory, and reality, S. Saunders, J. Barrett, A. Kent, and D. Wallace (eds), Oxford: Oxford University Press. 2010. 
 The Philosophy of Vacuum, S. Saunders and H. Brown (eds.),Clarendon Press, Oxford 1991.

Papers
	2010 ‘Chance in the Everett Interpretation’, in Many Worlds?: Everett, quantum theory, and reality, S. Saunders, J. Barrett, A. Kent, and D. Wallace (eds), Oxford: Oxford University Press (2010).
	2008b (with F.A. Muller), ‘Distinguishing Fermions’, British Journal of Philosophy of Science, 59, 499-548.
	2008a (with D. Wallace) ‘Branching and Uncertainty’, British Journal of Philosophy of Science, 59, 293-305.
	2007 ‘Mirroring as an A Priori Symmetry’, Philosophy of Science, 74, 452-480.
	2006a ‘On the Explanation of Quantum Statistics’, Studies in History and Philosophy of Modern Physics, 37, 192-211. Available online at https://arxiv.org/abs/quant-ph/0511136.
	2006b ‘Are Quantum Particles Objects?’, Analysis, 66, 52-63.
	2005a ‘Complementarity and Scientific Rationality’, Foundations of Physics, 35, 347-72. Available online at https://arxiv.org/abs/quant-ph/0412195.
	2005b ‘What is Probability?’, in Quo Vadis Quantum Mechanics, A. Elitzur, S. Dolev, and N. Kolenda, eds., Springer.
	2004a ‘Derivation of the Born Rule from Operational Assumptions’, Proceedings of the Royal Society A, 460, 1-18.
	2003a: ‘Physics and Leibniz’s Principles’, in Symmetries in Physics: Philosophical Reflections, K. Brading and E. Castellani, eds., Cambridge University Press.
	2003c ‘Structural Realism, Again’, Synthese, 136, 127-33.
	2003d "Indiscernibles, General Covariance, and Other Symmetries: the Case for Non-reductive Relationalism", in Revisiting the Foundations of Relativistic Physics: Festschrift in Honour of John Stachel,  A. Ashtekar, D. Howard, J. Renn, S. Sarkar, and A. Shimony, (eds.), Kluwer.
	 2002a ‘Is the Zero-Point Energy Real?’, in Ontological Aspects of Quantum Field Theory, M. Kuhlmann, H. Lyre, and A. Wayne, (eds)., Singapore: World Scientific.
	 2002b, ‘Why Relativity Contradicts Presentism’, Time, Reality, and Experience, C. Callender, ed., Cambridge University Press, 2002. Reprinted in Time and Physics: Volume 4 of The Philosophy of Time, N. Oaklander, ed., Routledge: forthcoming.
	 2001a ‘Space-Time and Probability', in Chance in Physics: Foundations and Perspectives,  J. Bricmont, D. Dürr, M.C. Galavotti, G. Ghirardi, F. Petruccione, N. Zanghi  (eds.), Springer-Verlag.
	2000 ‘Tense and Indeterminateness', Philosophy of Science (Proceedings), 67, S600-611.
	1999 ‘The "Beables" of Relativistic Pilot-Wave Theory', in From Physics to Philosophy, J. Butterfield, and C. Pagonis, (eds.), Cambridge University Press.
	1998a ‘Hertz's Principles', in Heinrich Hertz: Classical Physicist, Modern Philosopher, D. Baird et al, (eds.), Kluwer.
	1998b ‘Time, Quantum Mechanics, and Probability', Synthese, 114, p.405-44.
	1996a ‘Time, Quantum  Mechanics,  and  Tense', Synthese, 107, 19-53.
	1996b ‘Naturalizing Metaphysics', The Monist, 80, p.44-69.
	1995a ‘Time, Quantum Mechanics, and Decoherence', Synthese, 102, 235-66, 1995.
	1995b ‘Relativism', in Perspectives on Quantum Reality, R. Clifton, ed., Kluwer,  Dordrecht, 1995, p.125-42.
	1994a  ‘A  Dissolution  of  the  Problem  of  Locality",  Philosophy of Science (Proceedings), Vol.2, p. 88-98.
	1994b ‘Time and Quantum  Mechanics', in Physics and the Now, M. Bitbol, ed., Editions Frontieres, Paris, p. 21-70.
	1994c 'What is the Problem of Measurement', Harvard Review of Philosophy, Spring 1994.
	1994d ‘Decoherence and Evolutionary Adaptation', Physics Letters A 184, p. 1-5.
	1994e `Remarks on Decoherent Histories Theory and the Problem of Measurement', in Stochastic Evolution of Quantum States in Open Systems and in Measurement Processes, L. Diosi, ed., p. 94-105, World Scientific, Singapore.
	1993a ‘Decoherence, Relative States, and Evolutionary Adaptation', Foundations of Physics, 23, 1553-1585.
	1993b ‘To What Physics Corresponds', in Correspondence, Invariance, and Heuristics; Essays in Honour of Heinz Post, S. French and H. Kaminga, (eds.), Kluwer, p. 295-326.
	1992 ‘Locality, Complex Numbers, and Relativistic Quantum Theory', Proceedings of the Philosophy of Science Association, Vol.1, 1992, p. 365-380.
	1991 ‘The Negative Energy Sea', in 'Philosophy of Vacuum', S. Saunders and H. Brown (eds.), Clarendon Press, 1991, p. 65-110.
	1991 ‘Reflections on Ether' (with H. Brown), in Philosophy of Vacuum, p. 27-64.
	1988 ‘The Algebraic  Approach to Quantum Field Theory', in Philosophical Foundations of Quantum Field Theory,  H. Brown and R. Harre (eds.), Clarendon Press.

References

External links
Homepage of Simon Saunders
Oxford philosophy
Linacre College 
The Everett interpretation website
 The measurement problem in physics, In Our Time, BBC Radio 4, a discussion with Melvyn Bragg and guests Basil Hiley, Simon Saunders and Roger Penrose, 5 March 2009

1954 births
Living people
Alumni of New College, Oxford
Alumni of Christ's College, Cambridge
Alumni of King's College London
British physicists
Fellows of Merton College, Oxford
Fellows of Linacre College, Oxford
Philosophers of physics